Rank comparison chart of all armies of Post-Soviet states.

Officers (OF 1–10)

References

See also
Comparative army officer ranks of Asia
Comparative army officer ranks of Europe

Military comparisons